Basse-Banio is a department of Nyanga Province in southern Gabon. The capital lies at Mayumba. It had a population of 7,192 in 2013.

Towns and villages

References

Nyanga Province
Departments of Gabon